Tijuana Entertainment is a production company formed by Troy Searer and John Foy.

Originally signed by VH1 on a first-look deal, the pair was behind Celebreality shows Shooting Sizemore, Breaking Bonaduce, Supergroup, and Mission Man Band.

Searer and Foy's credits also include The Biggest Loser and Beauty and the Geek for NBC.

Television production companies of the United States